Langar is a village and jamoat in north-west Tajikistan. It is located in Kuhistoni Mastchoh District in Sughd Region. The jamoat has a total population of 9,666 (2015). It consists of 15 villages, including Madrushkat (the seat), Langar, Dehhisor, Dehmanora, Khayrobod and Khudgifi Bolo.

References

Populated places in Sughd Region
Jamoats of Tajikistan